The Diocese of Edmundston, is a Latin Church ecclesiastical territory or diocese of the Catholic Church in New Brunswick, Canada. The diocese was erected 16 December 1944. The Diocese of Edmundston is a suffragan diocese in the ecclesiastical province of the metropolitan Archdiocese of Moncton.

Bishops

Ordinaries
Marie-Antoine Roy, O.F.M. (1945–1948)
Joseph-Roméo Gagnon (1949–1970)
Fernand Lacroix, C.I.M. (1970–1983)
Gérard Dionne (1983–1993)
François Thibodeau, C.I.M. (1993–2009) - Bishop Emeritus
Claude Champagne, O.M.I. (2009–present)

Other priest of this diocese who became bishop
 Joseph-Aurèle Plourde, appointed Auxiliary Bishop of Alexandria in Ontario in 1964

External links and references
Diocese of Edmundston official site

Edmundston
Christian organizations established in 1944
Roman Catholic dioceses and prelatures established in the 20th century
Organizations based in New Brunswick
Edmundston
Catholic Church in New Brunswick
1944 establishments in New Brunswick